National Police Service (NPS) is the armed national police force in South Sudan.

Human rights 
Amnesty International accused it of torture in its 2012 Annual Report.

References

External links
South Sudan Police Service

Law enforcement in South Sudan